Karim Bibi Triki (born 16 August 1968) is the Algerian Minister of Post and Telecommunications. He was appointed as minister on 8 July 2021.

Education 
Triki holds a Bachelor of Mathematics (1986) from the Lycée Colonel Lotfi and a Master in Electronics (1991) from the University of Science and Technology.

References 

1968 births
Living people
21st-century Algerian politicians
Algerian politicians
Government ministers of Algeria